Ralph Albin Erickson (September 18, 1924 – November 28, 2006) was an American architect who also served Florida as a politician. Erickson was a Republican member of the Florida House of Representatives.

Erickson served in the United States Marine Corps during World War II. He attended the Illinois Institute of Technology and the University of Florida. He got into the Fulbright program to learn about architecture in 1953 in Finland. He was a musician and had a passion in fishing.

In 1961, Erickson was elected to the Florida House of Representatives alongside G. M. Nelson, succeeding William S. Boylston and George E. Youngberg Sr. In 1962, he and Nelson were succeeded by John W. Hasson and Russell C. Jordan Jr. 

After leaving Sarasota in the late 1960s, Erickson lived in  Washington, D.C., and served briefly as the chief architect of the Panama Canal Co. He also was chosen to design the Hatserim Israeli Air Force Base after Israel ceded land and a military base to Egypt as part of the Camp David Accords. Middle East peace.

Erickson died in November 2006, at the age of 82.

References 

1924 births
2006 deaths
Republican Party members of the Florida House of Representatives
20th-century American politicians
Illinois Institute of Technology alumni
University of Florida alumni
American emigrants to Finland
American male musicians
20th-century American musicians
American architects
Architects from Florida